The Chinese ambassador in Honiara was the official representative of the Government in Taipei to the Government of Solomon Islands up to 2019. Subsequently, the Government of the Solomon Islands broke off diplomatic relations with Taiwan and established new relations with the People's Republic of China.

List of representatives

References

See also 
 List of ambassadors of China to the Solomon Islands

 
Taiwan
Solomon Islands